Folami Ideraabdullah is an American geneticist and assistant professor in the Department of Genetics and the Department of Nutrition at the Gillings School of Global Public Health at the University of North Carolina at Chapel Hill. Ideraabdullah explores how maternal nutrition and environmental toxin exposure affect development through exploring epigenetic changes to DNA. She has found that maternal Vitamin D deficiencies can cause genome-wide changes in methylation patterns that persist for several generations and impact offspring health. Her international collaboration with the University of Witwatersrand represents the first time that metal levels in the placenta have been investigated in relation to birth outcomes in South Africa.

Early life and education 
Ideraabdullah wanted to be a scientist from a young age. It was in her high school biology class that she learned that DNA is the blueprint for biology, and this idea fascinated her. She wanted to understand how this blueprint could generate and sustain a healthy organism, and became dedicated to science ever since.

In 1997, Ideraabdullah pursued her undergraduate studies at Pennsylvania State University in University Park, Pennsylvania. She majored in biology with a concentration in genetics and explored undergraduate research opportunities in the lab of Andrew Clark. She conducted genetics research in Drosophila, which spearheaded a continued career in genetics. Ideraabdullah graduated in 2001 with a Bachelors of Science.

Following her undergraduate degree, Ideraabdullah moved to Chapel Hill, North Carolina to conduct her graduate research at the University of North Carolina at Chapel Hill in 2002. She worked under the mentorship of Fernando Pardo-Manuel de Villena in the Department of Genetics. She explored genetic diversity through a clear evolutionary framework. Her first work in the lab helped to elucidate the sequence diversity of 20 inbred mouse strains based on substitutions, insertions, and deletions. She found that deletions are more frequent than insertions and that sequence diversity is about two orders of magnitude higher among these strains than within the human population. Her thesis worked explored the genetic architecture of DDK syndrome and the genetic basis for embryonic lethality in mice. She found that the maternal and paternal components of the DDK syndrome are non-allelic based on characterizing the candidate intervals for the gene encoding the maternal and paternal factors. She also characterized the genetic modifiers that lead to a rescue phenotype for DDK syndrome. Ideraabdullah completed her graduate training in 2007.

Following her graduate training, Ideraabdullah pursued postdoctoral work under the mentorship of Marisa Bartolomei at the Perelman School of Medicine at the University of Pennsylvania. Here, Ideraabdullah gained expertise in the study of epigenetics. She studied the molecular mechanisms of genomic imprinting, where gene expression is dependent on whether the gene was inherited from the mother or the father. Since regulation of imprinted genes was thought to be governed by the epigenetic modifications to the imprinting control region (ICR), Ideraabdullah explored whether there are regions outside the ICR that are important in the regulation of imprinted genes. She mutated different regions within the ICR for H19/IGF2  and this caused a loss of repression of the imprinted gene, yet the methylation patterns at the imprinted gene's ICR and promoter region did not change. Her findings were the first to suggest that mechanisms outside the ICR are necessary to mediate the fully repressed state of an imprinted gene. Following this finding, Ideraabdullah generated and characterized a mouse model of Beckwith-Wiedemann Syndrome (BWS), a disorder caused by aberrations in gene imprinting. Using this tool, she explored how microdeletions in the imprinting control region for H19/IGF2 cause dysregulation of epigenetic marks and imprinted gene expression. She found that the deletion did not perturb DNA methylation, though it did impact gene repression and further that the impacts of the deletion on insulator function are tissue specific, in that only mesodermal tissues have disrupted insulator function.  Ideraabdullah completed her postdoctoral training in 2012.

Career and research 
In 2013, Ideraabdullah joined the Department of Genetics at the University of North Carolina at Chapel Hill as an assistant professor. She holds a joint appointment as an assistant professor in the Department of Nutrition at the Gillings School of Global Public Health and she is an Affiliate Member of the Nutrition Research Institute in Kannapolis, North Carolina. As of 2016, Ideraabdullah became an Honorary Researcher at the University of Witwatersrand in Johannesburg, South Africa within the MRC/Wits Developmental Pathways for Health Research Unit. Ideraabdullah is also a member of the Genetics Society of America.

Ideraabdullah is the principal investigator of the Ideraabdullah Lab which studies the mechanisms by which the epigenome is modified by the environment during development. Her lab has a focus on investigating the epigenetic impacts of vitamin D deficiency, pesticide exposure, and hyperglycemia during pregnancy.

Nutritional impact on epigenetic landscape 
One form of epigenetic modification is methylation, and thus methyl donor nutrients play a critical role in epigenetic modifications. Ideraabdullah was interested in exploring how maternal intake of methyl donors affects development of offspring. She found that the additive effects of a low methyl diet plus antibiotic treatment led to altered pup body weight, litter size and litter success.

Vitamin D is another critical nutrient for methylation, and vitamin D deficiency is a global problem with unknown impacts on maternal and child health. Ideraabdullah explored how maternal vitamin D deficiency alters the methylation and imprinted loci.  She found that deficiencies in vitamin D in mothers led to altered body weight and loss of DNA methylation in two subsequent generations of offspring in both somatic and germline tissues. To follow this study, Ideraabdullah's team explored the genome-wide methylation patterns in mouse sperm in controls versus developmentally vitamin D depleted animals. They found that developmental depletion of vitamin D led to loss of methylation epimutations in regions enriched for developmental and metabolic genes. Overall, Ideraabdullah has established that vitamin D deficiency had substantial effects on epigenetic modifications to the adult male germline that span several generations.

Soweto first 1000 days cohort 
Ideraabdullah collaborates with the University of Witwatersrand in Johannesburg, South Africa to assess how high exposure to metal affects birth outcomes. Their first study in 2019 explored if metal levels in the placenta of this cohort were related to birth outcomes.  They established that the cohort had higher cadmium levels than global cohort measurements, and lower essential elements such as nickel and chromium.  They found that cadmium, selenium, and nickel were all related to placenta and birth outcomes and they are currently investigating the mechanisms by which this correlation manifests.

Awards and honors 

 2020 Named Top 100 Inspiring Black Scientists in America by Cell Press
 2019 Recipient of Vitamin D Workshop Young Investigator Award
 2015 University Research Council Award - University of North Carolina
 2014 IBM Junior Faculty Development Award - UNC
 2011 FASEB-MARC Travel Award - GSA Mouse Genetics Meeting
 2010-2011 Mentored Scientist Transition Award
 2008-2010 Ruth L. Kirschstein National Research Service Award
 2009 Carl Storm Underrepresented Minority Fellowship
 2006 Sarah Graham Kenan/ Edwards-Hobgood Dissertation Fellowship

Select publications 

 Edward Pietryk, Kiristin Clement, Marwa Elnagheeb, Kuster R, Kilpatrick K, Love MI, Ideraabdullah FY. Intergenerational response to the endocrine disruptor vinclozolin is influenced by maternal genotype and crossing scheme. Reprod Toxicol. 2018 Mar 10;78:9-19 
 Ideraabdullah FY, Zeisel SH. Dietary Modulation of the Epigenome. Physiol Rev. 2018 Apr 1;98(2):667-695. PubMed 
 Xue J, Schoenrock SA, Valdar W, Tarantino L, and Ideraabdullah FY. Maternal Vitamin D depletion alters DNA methylation at imprinted loci in multiple generations. J Clin Epig. 2016. 8:107 ; PMCID: PMC5062906
 Xue J, and Ideraabdullah FY. An assessment of molecular pathways of obesity susceptible to nutrient, toxicant and genetically induced epigenetic perturbation. Jour of Nutr Biochem. 2016 Apr;30: 1-13 
 Ideraabdullah FY, Thorvaldsen JL, Myers JA, Bartolomei MS. Tissue specific insulator function at H19/Igf2 revealed by deletions at the imprinting control region. Hum Mol Genet. 2014 Dec 1:23(23):6246-59. 
 Ideraabdullah FY, Bartolomei MS. ZFP57: KAPturing DNA methylation at imprinted loci. Molecular Cell, 2011 Nov; 4:44(3):341-2. 
 Ideraabdullah FY, Vigneau S, Bartolomei MS. Genomic imprinting mechanisms in mammals. Mutation Research/Fundamental and Molecular Mechanisms of Mutagenesis, 2008 Dec; 647(1-2):77-85. 
 Ideraabdullah FY*, De la Casa-Esperon E*, Bell TA*, Detwiler DA, Magnuson T, Sapienza C, Pardo-Manuel de Villena F. Genetic and haplotype diversity among wild-derived mouse inbred strains. Genome Research, 2004 Oct;14:1880-1887.

References 

Living people
University of North Carolina faculty
American geneticists
Year of birth missing (living people)